Matthew Ebden was the defending champion, but chose not to defend his title.

Lu Yen-hsun won the title after defeating Marius Copil 7–5, 7–6(13–11) in the final.

Seeds

Draw

Finals

Top half

Bottom half

External Links
 Main Draw
 Qualifying Draw

Aegon Surbiton Trophy - Men's Singles
2016 Singles